Pintura or Pinturas may refer to:
 Pintura, Utah, an unincorporated community in Washington County, Utah
 Pinturas River, a river in Patagonia Argentina
 Pinturas River Canyon or Cañadón Río Pinturas, a town of Perito Moreno in Santa Cruz, Argentina
 Pintura á pó, type of coating that is applied as a free-flowing, dry powder